The common scaly-foot (Pygopus lepidopodus) is a widespread species of legless lizard in the Pygopodidae family. It is endemic to Australia.

Habit
Mostly active at dusk or dawn (crepuscular), it can be nocturnal after high daytime temperatures. It lives in long grasses, heaths, and woodlands, and is most often seen on warm mornings, foraging for food. When threatened, the scaly-foot flashes its thick, fleshy tongue, in an apparent mimicry of snakes. Usually two eggs are laid per clutch.

Diet
Its diet includes a variety of invertebrates such as burrowing spiders. The scaly-foot reportedly also eating other lizards in captivity, and vegetable matter, with a preference for bananas.

Distribution
It is found mostly in the southern and eastern parts of Australia, though isolated populations occur in semiarid southern Queensland and tropical wet Queensland.

Description
The scaly-foot is snake-like in appearance, up to 80 cm in length with a noticeable "keel" or ridge on the top. Variable in colours and pattern, it occasionally is grey with black spots or sometimes coppery brown with a grey tail. Other patterns and variations occur. Prominent limb flaps may be seen on close inspection, hence the name "scaly-foot".

Captivity
Considered an easy to keep species, a license is required to keep the common scaly-foot as a pet in Australia.

References

External links
museumsvictoria.com.au
Books.google.com.au

Pygopodids of Australia
Pygopus
Legless lizards
Endemic fauna of Australia
Reptiles described in 1804